Callisia graminea, called the grassleaf roseling, is a plant species native to the southeastern United States. It has been reported from Florida, Georgia, North and South Carolina, Virginia and Maryland. It grows on sandy soil in thickets, pine barrens, and disturbed sites.

Callisia graminea is an erect to trailing perennial herb growing in clumps. Leaves are narrow and linear, up to 17 mm (0.7 inches) long, with a basal sheath wrapping around the stem. Flowers are pink to rose-colored.

References

graminea
Endemic flora of the United States
Flora of the Southeastern United States
Plants described in 1903
Taxa named by John Kunkel Small
Flora without expected TNC conservation status